Eric Andersen (born 1940 in Antwerp) is a Danish artist associated with the Fluxus art movement. He lives in Copenhagen, Denmark.

Life and work
In 1962 Andersen first took part in one of the early concerts given by Fluxus held during the Festum Fluxorum in the Nikolai Kirke (Nicolas Church) in Copenhagen. He soon took an early interest in intermedial art. In his Opus works from the early 1960s, Andersen explored the open interaction between performer and public, developing open self-transforming works, such as arte strumentale.

Andersen’s performances depend very much on the public. This is true of not only his Fluxus actions but also his installations, to which the public may be prompted to contribute. From 1962 to 1966 he worked closely with Arthur Kopcke, turned in the late 1960s to mail art and then in the 1970s was concerned with geographical space. His most eminent works include Hidden Paintings, Crying Spaces, Confession Kitchens, Lawns that turn towards the Sun and Artificial Stars.

Andersen was often a guest in the former East Block countries. In 1966, he held a three-day event in Prague with the Fluxus artists Tomas Schmit and Milan Knížák. Those were the first Fluxus events in Czechoslovakia. In Poland he exhibited in Galeria Akumulatory 2 in Poznań and in the Galeria Potocka in Kraków.

In 1996, the year in which Copenhagen was Europe’s cultural capital, Andersen arranged a three-day inter-media event involving parachute-jumping, helicopters, mountaineering, live sheep and 500 singers walking on water.

In 2017 the book The Glorious Way of Unproductivity was published by Per Brunskog. A textbook in inter-media, based exclusively on Eric Andersen's work.

Footnotes

See also
 Digital Art
 Computer art
 Systems art
 post-conceptual
 Generative art

References
 Owen Smith (1998) Fluxus: The History of an Attitude, San Diego State University Press
 Block, René, ed. 1962 Wiesbaden Fluxus 1982. Wiesbaden (BRD): Harlekin Art; Wiesbaden: Museum Wiesbaden and Nassauischer Kunstverein; Kassel: Neue Galerie der Staatliche, 1982.
 Friedman, Ken, ed. The Fluxus Reader. Chicester, West Sussex and New York: Academy Editions, 1998.
 Gray, John. Action Art. A Bibliography of Artists’ Performance from Futurism to Fluxus and Beyond. Westport, Connecticut: Greenwood Press, 1993.
 Hendricks, Geoffrey, ed. Critical Mass, Happenings, Fluxus, performance, intermedia and Rutgers University 1958–1972. Mason Gross Art Galleries, Rutgers, and Mead Art Gallery, Amherst, 2003.  Page 85
 Hendricks, Jon. Fluxus Codex. New York: Harry N. Abrams, Inc. 1989.
 Jon Hendricks, ed. Fluxus, etc.: The Gilbert and Lila Silverman Collection. Bloomfield Hills, Michigan: Cranbrook Museum of Art, 1982.
 Higgins, Hannah. Fluxus Experience. Berkeley: University of California Press, 2002.  p. 150
 Kellein, Thomas. Fluxus. London and New York: Thames and Hudson, 1995.
 Milman, Estera, ed. Fluxus: A Conceptual Country, [Visible Language, vol. 26, nos. 1/2] Providence: Rhode Island School of Design, 1992.
 Moren, Lisa. Intermedia. Baltimore, Maryland: University of Maryland, Baltimore County, 2003.
 Paull, Silke  and Hervé Würz, eds. How we met or a microdemystification. Saarbrücken-Dudweiler (Germany) 1977, Engl.-German, AQ 16, Incl. a bibliography by Hanns Sohm.
 Phillpot, Clive, and Jon Hendricks, eds. Fluxus: Selections from the Gilbert and Lila Silverman Collection. New York: Museum of Modern Art, 1988. 
 Schmidt-Burkhardt, Astrit. Maciunas’ Learning Machine from Art History to a Chronology of Fluxus. Detroit, Michigan: Gilbert and Lila Silverman Fluxus Collection, 2005.
 In the spirit of Fluxus by Elizabeth Armstrong, Janet Jenkins, Joan Rothfuss, Simon Anderson, Walker Art Center.  page 37
 New York Magazine Going with the Flow - 7 Mar 1983 - v. 16, no. 10,  Page 104
 The invisible masterpiece by Hans Belting, Helen Atkins 
 Happenings and Other Acts (Worlds of Performance) by M. Sandford  Page 77
 Fluxus: today and yesterday by Johan Pijnappel  Page 28
 The readymade boomerang by René Block, Art Gallery of New South Wales  Page 138, 147
 New art examiner by Chicago New Art Association, Pennsylvania New Art Association, Washington, D.C. New Art Association. v. 21 - 1993  page 21
 Philosophy and love by Linnell Secomb  page 138
 Upheavals, manifestos, manifestations By Klaus Schrenk, Städitsche Kunsthalle Düsseldorf   page 26, 27
 Modernism since Postmodernism By Dick Higgins  page 77,108
 Action art By John Gray   page 106
 The cinema of Scandinavia By Tytti Soila  page 225
 Networked Art By Craig J. Saper  page 161
 The Fluxus constellation  Sandra Solimano, Eric Andersen, Villa Croce (Museum : Genoa, Italy) 
 Pop art  Marco Livingstone, Dan Cameron, Musée des beaux-arts de Montréal  Page 234
 Neo-avant-garde By David Hopkins, Anna Katharina Schaffner   Page 158
 A flexible history of Fluxus facts and fictions By Emmett Williams, Ann Noël   Page 40,120
 Berlinart 1961-1987 By Kynaston McShine, René Block, San Francisco Museum of Modern Art  Page 69
 Artistic Bedfellows By Holly Crawford  Page 159
 Not the other avant-garde By James Martin Harding, John Rouse  Page 278
 Commentaries on the new media arts By Robert C. Morgan  Page 5
 Annual Bibliography of Modern Art, 1991 By Museum Of Modern Art Library  Page 176
 "The Computational Word Works of Eric Andersen and Dick Higgins" by Hannah Higgins in H. Higgins, & D. Kahn (Eds.), Mainframe experimentalism: Early digital computing in the experimental arts, pp. 279–287

External links
Archivio Conz
ERIC ANDERSEN fluxus debris!
Eric Andersen
Fluxus Text about Eric Andersen
Text on Eric Andersen at Ubuweb
Until everyone gets their own Kingdom
Fondazione Bonotto

Links Eric Andersen

Belgian contemporary artists
Fluxus
Danish conceptual artists
Neo-Dada
1940 births
Living people
Artists from Antwerp